Katelyn Tuohy (born March 18, 2002) is an American middle- and long-distance runner. She is a four-time NCAA champion (3000 meters, 5000 meters outdoor and indoor, and cross country).

By the 2019 cross country season, Tuohy had won five Gatorade Player of the Year awards and was the 2018 Track & Field News High School Girls Athlete Of The Year.

Early life
Katelyn Tuohy comes from suburban Rockland County, New York. At only ten years old, while running with her parents, Patrick and Denise, she was spotted as a potentially remarkable talent by her coach-to-be, Brian Diglio. She has a brother Patrick, two years older, who was also a successful cross country runner while competing for North Rockland High School. He now runs track at Fordham University. Their brother Ryan is six years younger than Katelyn.

Competition
Encouraged by her family, she began setting age-group records in the 7th grade, retiring marks set by earlier high school phenom Mary Cain. In 2018, Tuohy's remarkable potential had fostered New York Times speculation on her future. Diglio, who is also her Advanced Placement U.S. History teacher, has endeavored to keep Tuohy in check while guarding her progress. “My role so far has been to try to put the brakes on, so she doesn’t do too much,” he said. “She has an unbelievable work ethic; I’ve never seen anything like it." He feels her academic diligence is as important as her athletic accomplishments. She finished the 2017–18 school year with a 4.59 GPA.

2017
Tuohy first took 32 seconds off the historic Van Cortlandt Park course record, during the Manhattan College XC Invite, in the Bronx, New York, with 13:21 for the 2.5 mile/4 kilometer event. Then she won the Nike National cross country championship as a sophomore, to cap an undefeated season. With a 5000 meter time of 16:44.7, she won by 40 seconds, trimming 12 seconds off the course record, despite cold and muddy conditions. The Rockland County legislature honored her victory, declaring December 19 as "Katelyn Tuohy Day." Tuohy competed for the North Rockland High School Red Raiders. She became the fastest US outdoor high school 3200-meter girl runner of all-time, running 9:47.88.

2018
On January 20, Tuohy also set the U.S. national junior and high school indoor 5000-meter record, when she ran 15:37.12. In May, she became the fastest US outdoor high school 3200-meter runner of all-time, running 9:47.88. Her 9:09.71 for 3000 meters, run in June, was the second fastest U.S. outdoors time ever in the country by a high school girl. On June 17, 2018, at the New Balance Outdoor Nationals T&F Championships in Greensboro, North Carolina, Tuohy won the mile by over 15 seconds, breaking Polly Plumer's 36-year high school outdoor mile record with a 4:33.87. On September 22, at the Ocean State Invitational, Tuohy ran the fastest American girls cross country 5K ever with a time of 16:06.87, lowering the course record by 88 seconds, and leading her team to victory. Her time clipped almost 17 seconds from  Katie Rainsberger's 2016 best-ever high school girls' standard on any course, running faster than all but one of over 1000 high school boys running the sandy course that day. On October 19, her 16:45.4 broke her own Bowdoin course record, set in 2017 while winning the state federation championship. The next fastest girl ran 19:07.9. On November 23, she won the 5K New York State XC Championship/Nike NY Regionals, in 17:14.0, by over 40 seconds. On December 1, despite her missing her state section championship race with knee tendonitis, a few weeks earlier, she repeated as Nike's Cross Nationals Individual Champion. Notwithstanding muddy conditions, she set a new course record time of 16:37.8.

2019
On January 26, in New York City (NYC), while finishing third in the 3000, against seven pros, she broke Mary Cain's high school indoor record with 9:01.81. That gave her four of the fastest eight ever indoor times by a high school girl for the distance. On March 10, also in NYC, competing in the New Balance Indoor Two Mile, her 9:51.05 for first place made her the second fastest ever U.S. high school girl, indoors or outdoors. She also ran 2:48.77 for 1000 meters, indoors. Consideration was given to have her competing exclusively in open competition, rather than in high school events. It was thought that experiencing stiffer competition from professional runners might be expected to benefit her regarding the possibility of Olympic Trials training to follow in 2020. Despite feeling ill, on June 7 she repeated her 2018 state 3000 meter title with a 9:21.9, 15 seconds in front of Chmeil. Due to her academic workload, allergies and an intense track schedule, Tuohy, conferring with her family and coaches, chose to end her outdoor season in early June, and anticipated returning to competition at cross-country in the fall.

In her first major race of the season, Tuohy won the Great American Cross Country race in North Carolina, 13 seconds under the course record. On October 12, she won the Manhattan College Cross-Country Invitational elite Eastern States race in 13:33.2 on the 2.5-mile Van Cortlandt Park loop, missing her course record but winning by 12 seconds. On November 16, Tuohy won her third consecutive New York State cross country championship in 15:36.5 on a course that was snowy and slushy in parts. On November 29, she repeated as the Nike New York Regional qualifier, running 17:06.6 on the Bowdoin course, more than 20 seconds in front of runner-up Claire Walters. On December 7, Tuohy became the first athlete, boy or girl, to become a three-time NXN champion. She won the race in 17:18.4. This was the closest margin of victory for not only Tuohy but in NXN history. Beavercreek, Ohio's racewalking U-20 record holder Taylor Ewert finished second in 17:19.1, and Sydney Thorvaldson of Rawlins, Wyoming was third in 17.19.4. Ewert and Thorvaldson had closed a substantial late-race gap on the chilly and muddy course. After her last high school race, Tuohy underwent knee surgery.

College Career
Tuohy entered NC State as a freshman in 2020. She missed most of the fall season with an injury, but she made her NCAA debut in February 2021 at the Carmel City Invitational.

2021
In her first year at North Carolina State University, Katelyn raced once during the cross country season in the NCAA Division I Cross Country Championships, placing 24th with a time of 20:41.3. She was the top freshman finisher in 2020 (the meet took place in March 2021) and the only freshman to achieve All-American status. NC State placed second. Tuohy won an individual title at the Adidas XC Challenge. She won the 5k in a time of 16:29.6. This earned her the ACC Performer of the Week honors. During the regional meet, she earned All-Region honors by placing second-place with a time of 20:06.2 at the regional meet. Katelyn bettered on her 2020* performance by placing 15th at the NCAA Cross Country Championships with a time of 19:43.0. She helped NC State take home the team title. She once again was selected as an All-American.

2022
Tuohy won the Atlantic Coast Conference 1500 meter in 4:06.84, the nation's 2022 leading time, and finished second in the 5000 m hours later. Her 2022 best times, including a 15:14.61 for 5000 meters, ranked respectively as the eighth and seventh fastest ever for collegians. On June 11, Katelyn won the NCAA 5000 m outdoor title in 15:18.39. Two weeks after soundly beating 2020 NCAA XC Champ Mercy Chelangat at Notre Dame, Tuohy won Wisconsin's Nuttycombe 6K cross country invitational in 19:44.3, leading her NC State team to a tiebreaker win over the second ranked University of New Mexico Lobos. On October 28, she won the 2022 ACC Cross Country Championships with a new course record of 19:08 (for 6K) and helped her team win the team championship title.  On November 19, at the NCAA Division I Cross Country Championships, Tuohy came from more than 11 seconds back to overtake Florida's Parker Valby at around the five kilometer mark, and ended up winning the women's individual championship. This also helped propel NC State to the 2022 women's team crown. Afterward, she signed an NIL deal with Adidas Running.

2023
Tuohy opened the 2023 season on January 28 by breaking the NCAA record in the women’s indoor mile by finishing third in 4:24.26 at the Dr. Sander Invitational Columbia Challenge. She beat the previous record (4:25.91) set by Jenny Simpson (then Barringer) in 2009. On February 11 at the Millrose Games in New York, she set a new NCAA indoor 3000 m record with a time of 8:35.20, smashing Karissa Schweizer’ previous collegiate best of 8:41.60.

Achievements

NCAA titles
 NCAA Division I Women's Outdoor Track and Field Championships
 5000 meters: 2022
 NCAA Division I Women's Indoor Track and Field Championships
 3000 meters: 2023
 5000 meters: 2023
 NCAA Women's Division I Cross Country Championship
 6 km XC: 2022

Collegiate achievements
 1500 meters indoor – 4:06.49 NCAA record
 Mile indoor – 4:24.26 NCAA record
 3000 meters indoor – 8:35.20 NCAA record
 3000 meters indoor U20 – 8:54.17

High school achievements
High school national records:
 Mile – 4:33.87 (Greensboro, NC 2018)
 3000 meters indoor – 9:01.81 (New York 2019)
 3200 meters – 9:47.88 (White Plains, NY 2018)
 5000 meters indoor – 15:37.12 (Lynchburg, VA 2018) 

Nike Cross Nationals champion: 2017, 2018, 2019

Honors and awards
 Gatorade Female Athlete of the Year: 2018
 Gatorade Female XC Athlete of the Year: 2018, 2019, 2020
 Gatorade Female Track Athlete of the Year: 2018

During her sophomore year in 2017–2018, Tuohy won both the Gatorade Female Cross Country Player of the Year award and the Gatorade Female Track & Field Player of the Year award, making her the first athlete ever to capture the award in two sports, then she won the overall Gatorade Female Athlete of the Year award. Her photo was on the cover of Sports Illustrated that summer.  In October 2018, she was honored as the Track and Field News High School Girls Athlete Of The Year. In 2019, she repeated as the Gatorade female cross country awardee for her undefeated 2018 season. Track and Field News named her as 2019's repeat "Indoor Girls Athlete of the Year". After winning the Nike Girls Cross Country Championships in Portland, Oregon, in 2019, she was again named the Gatorade Player of the Year, matching track star and future Olympian, Marion Jones as the only other such three-peat winner. The Gatorade award also factors in academic performance. In her originating high school district, the North Rockland Chamber of Commerce awarded Touhy with the first annual Student of the Year award. Tuohy is an A student, destined for North Carolina State University.

References

External links
 NC State bio
 Video of Katelyn Tuohy National Record 3200m 9:47.88
 Video Katelyn Tuohy National Record 5000m 15:37.12 
 Video Katelyn Tuohy breaks national HS mile record 4:33.87
 Video 2017 NXN Nationals Girls Race
 Video 2018 NXN Nationals Girls Race
 Video 2019 NXN Nationals Girls Race

2002 births
Living people
American female middle-distance runners
People from Thiells, New York
People from Rockland County, New York
Track and field athletes from New York (state)
Sportspeople from the New York metropolitan area
NC State Wolfpack women's cross country runners
NC State Wolfpack women's track and field athletes
21st-century American women